Argentina competed at the 1992 Summer Paralympics in Barcelona, Spain. 27 competitors from Argentina won 2 medals, 1 gold and 1 silver, to finish 40th in the medal table.

See also 
 Argentina at the Paralympics
 Argentina at the 1992 Summer Olympics

References 

Argentina at the Paralympics
1992 in Argentine sport
Nations at the 1992 Summer Paralympics